PILIPINO Mirror is a daily tabloid in the Philippines. It is published by the Pilipino Mirror Media Group, a division of the ALC Group of Companies owned by former Philippine ambassador to Laos Antonio Cabangon Chua.

Advertising slogans
 Salamín ng Katotohanan (Filipino, "Mirror of Truth") (April 16, 2012-March 19, 2017)
 Unang Tabloid sa Negosyo (Filipino, "First Tabloid for Business")

See also
 Business Mirror
 DWIZ
 IZTV Manila
 97.9 Home Radio
 CNN Philippines

References

External links
 

National newspapers published in the Philippines
Newspapers published in Metro Manila
Publications established in 2012
Daily newspapers published in the Philippines